The Ten Thousand Islands National Wildlife Refuge is located in Southwest Florida in Collier County, between Marco Island and Everglades City, Florida.  The refuge was first established in 1996 and covers 35,000 acres of the Ten Thousand Islands.  The refuge includes both fresh and saltwater, and protects a large area of mangrove forest.

Activities include fishing, hunting, bird watching, kayaking and camping.

The refuge is home to a wide variety of plants and animals.  There are approximately 200 species of fish, 189 species of birds and innumerable plant species.

References

External links

National Wildlife Refuges in Florida
Protected areas of Collier County, Florida
Protected areas established in 1996
Wetlands of Florida
Landforms of Collier County, Florida
1996 establishments in Florida